Megachile strenua is a species of bee in the family Megachilidae. It was described by Smith in 1879.

References

Strenua
Insects described in 1879